ADHD is the debut studio album by American rapper Joyner Lucas. It was released on March 27, 2020, by his self-owned label, Twenty Nine Music Group. The album features four skits with music created for the album by Leo Son. The album features guest appearances by Logic, Young Thug, Chris Brown, Timbaland, Fabolous, and King OSF and production from Boi-1da, Timbaland, Highself, Jahaan Sweet, Illmind, Bregma among others

Background
The album was announced on October 12, 2018. Lucas has stated that his childhood diagnosis with Attention Deficit Hyperactivity Disorder was the inspiration for the album.

Lucas released the album's lead single, "I Love", on October 17, 2018. He continued to release singles from the album throughout 2019 and 2020. He unveiled the album's track listing on March 24, 2020.

Commercial performance
ADHD debuted at number ten on the US Billboard 200 with 39,000 album-equivalent units, including 10,000 album sales in its first week. It is Lucas' first US top-10 album.

Track listing

Charts

Weekly charts

Year-end charts

Certifications

References

2020 debut albums
Joyner Lucas albums
The Orchard (company) albums
Albums produced by Boi-1da
Albums produced by Mally Mall
Albums produced by Illmind
Albums produced by Timbaland